Desulfotignum  is a Gram-negative and strictly anaerobic bacteria with a single polar flagellum genus from the family of Desulfobacteraceae.

References

Further reading 
 
 
 

Desulfobacterales
Bacteria genera